Eubela is a genus of sea snails, marine gastropod mollusks in the family Raphitomidae.

Description
The shell is smooth, glossy, with a sutural band.  The outer lip is sharp. A shallow anal sinus and a short angular siphonal canal recall that of Trichotropis.

Species
Species within the genus Eubela include:

 Eubela aequatorialis Thiele, 1925
 † Eubela awakinoensis Powell, 1942 
 Eubela calyx (Dall, 1889)
 Eubela distincta Thiele, 1925
 Eubela limacina (Dall, 1881)
 Eubela mcgintyi Schwengel, 1943
 † Eubela monile Marwick, 1931 
 Eubela nipponica Kuroda, 1938
 Eubela plebeja Thiele, 1925
Species brought into synonymy 
 Eubela sofia (Dall, 1889): synonym of Xanthodaphne sofia (Dall, 1889)

References

External links
 Worldwide Mollusc Species Data Base: Raphitomidae
  Bouchet, P.; Kantor, Y. I.; Sysoev, A.; Puillandre, N. (2011). A new operational classification of the Conoidea (Gastropoda). Journal of Molluscan Studies. 77(3): 273-308

 
Raphitomidae
Gastropod genera